The Orsa class (sometimes called the Pegaso class) were a group of large torpedo boats or destroyer escorts built for the Italian Navy in the late 1930s. Four were built, with two being lost during the Second World War. The surviving pair were rebuilt as anti-submarine frigates in the 1950s.

Ships

References

External links
 Orsa-class torpedo Marina Militare website

Torpedo boat classes
Ships built in Italy
Torpedo boats of the Regia Marina
World War II torpedo boats of Italy